Li Shanshan is the name of:

 Li Shanshan (basketball) (born 1987), Chinese basketball player
 Li Shanshan (gymnast) (born 1992), Chinese gymnast
 Li Shanshan (discus thrower) (born 1992), Chinese discus thrower

See also
 Lee San-san (born 1977), Hong Kong actress